The  singles Tournament at the 2005 Gaz de France Stars took place in late October, 2005, on indoor hard courts in Hasselt, Belgium.

Kim Clijsters was the home crowd favourite; and emerged as the winner.

Elena Dementieva was the defending champion, but chose to compete in the 2005 Generali Ladies Linz instead.

Seeds

Draw

Finals

Top half

Bottom half

References

2005 Singles
Gaz de France Stars - Singles
2005 in Belgian tennis
Sport in Hasselt